Sacko is a surname, and may refer to:

Bouba Sacko (died 2011), Malian guitarist
Falaye Sacko (born 1995), Malian football player
Fanta Sacko, Malian musician
Fatimatou Sacko (born 1985), French basketball player
George MacDonald Sacko (1936–2011), Liberian football player
Hadi Sacko (born 1994), French football player
Ibrahim Sacko (born 1993), French football player
Ihsan Sacko (born 1997), French football player
Souleymane Dela Sacko (born 1977), Nigerien football player
Soumana Sacko (born 1950), Malian politician and former Prime Minister

See also
Madiga Sacko, commune in western Mali
Sacco (disambiguation), a commune in Italy and an Italian surname
The Sacko, a booby prize for the characters on the American television show The League